Steinbach's tuco-tuco (Ctenomys steinbachi) is a species of rodent in the family Ctenomyidae. It is endemic to Bolivia. The species is named after zoological collector Dr. José Steinbach (1856–1929).

References

Tuco-tucos
Mammals of Bolivia
Endemic fauna of Bolivia
Mammals described in 1907
Taxa named by Oldfield Thomas
Taxonomy articles created by Polbot